Roger Mellor Makins, 1st Baron Sherfield,  (3 February 1904 – 9 November 1996), was a British diplomat who served as British Ambassador to the United States from 1953 to 1956.

Background and early life
Makins was the son of Brigadier-General Sir Ernest Makins (1869–1959) and Florence Mellor. He was educated at Winchester and Christ Church, Oxford, and was called to the Bar, Inner Temple, in 1927.

Early diplomatic career
However, he never practised and instead joined the Diplomatic Service in 1928. Makins was later appointed to be Minister Plenipotentiary at the British Embassy in Washington in 1945, and served until 1947. He was Assistant Under-Secretary of State at the Foreign Office from 1947 to 1948 and as Deputy Under-Secretary of State from 1948 to 1952.

Ambassador to the United States

In 1953 he was appointed to be the Ambassador to the United States, a post he held until 1956. On the eve of the Suez Crisis, he was present at the crucial meeting on 25 September 1956 where Harold Macmillan was apparently persuaded that US President Dwight D. Eisenhower had offered the British Government tacit support; Makins, on the other hand, concluded correctly that Eisenhower would not support the intervention.

Later career in the civil service
After his return from Washington he served as Joint Permanent Secretary to The Treasury from 1956 to 1960 and as Chairman of the United Kingdom Atomic Energy Authority from 1960 to 1964.

Chancellorship
Makins was appointed to the post of Chancellor of the University of Reading in 1969, and retained this position until 1992.

Marriage

On 30 April 1934, in an Episcopal ceremony in Tallahassee, Florida, he married an American, Alice Brooks Davis (d.1985), the daughter of Dwight F. Davis, founder of the Davis Cup and former US Secretary of War.

Honours
Makins was appointed to the Order of St Michael and St George as a Companion (CMG) in the 1944 New Year Honours and was promoted in the same Order as a Knight Commander (KCMG) in the 1949 Birthday Honours. He was appointed to the Order of the Bath as a Knight Commander (KCB) in the 1953 New Year Honours. He was promoted in the Order of St Michael and St George as a Knight Grand Cross (GCMG) in the 1955 New Year Honours and was promoted within the Order of the Bath as a Knight Grand Cross (GCB) in the 1960 New Year Honours.

In the 1964 Birthday Honours, Makins was raised to the peerage as Baron Sherfield, of Sherfield-on-Loddon in the County of Southampton.

He was elected to be a Fellow of the Royal Society (FRS) under Statute 12 (for those "who have rendered conspicuous service to the cause of science, or are such that election would be of signal benefit to the Society") in 1986.

Arms

The Makins Collection

Makins was a notable collector of Victorian art. The Makins Collection contained important works by John Everett Millais.

References

External links

Interview about the Korean War for the WGBH-TV series, War and Peace in the Nuclear Age
Artworks in the Makins Collection at the Bridgeman Art Library

1904 births
1996 deaths
Members of HM Diplomatic Service
Chancellors of the University of Reading
Deputy Lieutenants of Hampshire
Knights Grand Cross of the Order of the Bath
Knights Grand Cross of the Order of St Michael and St George
Makins, Roger Mellor
Alumni of Christ Church, Oxford
People educated at West Downs School
Diplomatic peers
People educated at Winchester College
Makins, Roger
Makins, Roger
Hereditary barons created by Elizabeth II
People from Sherfield on Loddon
20th-century British diplomats